Raymond Steele (19 May 1917 – 22 November 1993, educated at Scotch College, Melbourne) was an Australian rules footballer who played in the VFL from 1940 to 1943 for the Richmond Football Club.

Steele also played District Cricket for University and Hawthorn-East Melbourne between 1937 and 1949, later serving as President of the Victorian Cricket Association for 19 years and Treasurer of the Australian Cricket Board for 16 years. Steele was the manager of the Australian cricket team on its 1972 tour of England. 

Steele was awarded the Order of the British Empire, O.B.E. for services to cricket.

References

Sources
 Chappell, I. (1972), Tigers among the Lions, Lynton Publications: Coromandel Valley. . 
 Hogan P: The Tigers Of Old, Richmond FC, Melbourne 1996

1917 births
1993 deaths
Richmond Football Club players
Richmond Football Club Premiership players
Officers of the Order of the British Empire
Australian cricket administrators
People educated at Scotch College, Melbourne
University Blacks Football Club players
Australian rules footballers from Victoria (Australia)
One-time VFL/AFL Premiership players
Sport Australia Hall of Fame inductees